Branchiibius is a genus of bacteria from the family Dermacoccaceae.

References

Further reading 
 

 

Micrococcales
Bacteria genera